Nigel Campbell Pennick (born 1946 in Guildford, Surrey, England) is a marine biologist, who has also published  on occultism, magic, natural magic, divination, subterranea, rural folk customs, traditional performance and Celtic art as well as runosophy.

He is a writer on marine species as well as an occultist and geomancer, artist and illustrator, stained-glass designer and maker, musician and mummer. He also writes on European arts and crafts, buildings, landscape, customs, games and spiritual traditions. He has written several booklets on the history of urban transport in Cambridge and London. He is best known for his research on geomancy, labyrinths, sacred geometry, the spiritual arts and crafts, esoteric alphabets and Germanic runic studies.

He has written many books in German and has over 50 published books and hundreds of published papers on a wide range of subjects.

Early life
Pennick lived most of his childhood in post-war London.
At some stage his family moved to Stanstead Essex from where he attended Newport (Essex) Free Grammar School from 1958 to 1965

Career

Scientific
Trained in biology, for 15 years he was a researcher in algal taxonomy for a government institute in Cambridge. During this time, he published 26 scientific research papers on ultrastructure and taxonomy of marine microorganisms including descriptions of eight new species of marine algae and protozoa previously unknown to science before moving on to become a writer and illustrator.

Esoteric
He has travelled extensively in Europe and North America, researching, lecturing and conducting workshops, creating shrines and labyrinths.

His Celtic artwork appeared in the book New Visions in Celtic Art. In 2002 his Celtic artwork was on show in Birmingham in the Celtic Art and Design exhibition at the Central Library and, in 2009 in the exhibit Celtic Spirit Worldwide at the Walkers' Gallery in San Marcos, Texas.

He founded the Institute of Geomantic Research and later The Library of the European Tradition, which published new research on geomancy and folklore as well as rare archival material from the 19th and early 20th century. In the late 1970s and early 1980s he organized six geomantic conferences in Cambridge and Royston.

Partial bibliography

 Caerdroia: Ancient Turf, Stone, and Pavement Mazes, Trumpington, Cambridge: Megalithic Visions, 1974.
 Holy Sepulchre: The Round Churches of Britain, Trumpington, Cambridge: Megalithic Visions, 1974.
 Runic, Trumpington, Cambridge: Megalithic Visions, 1974.7
 East Anglian Geomancy, Cambridge: Fenris-Wolf, 1975.
 European Metrology, Cambridge: Fenris-Wolf, 1975.
 Lost Towns of the Sunken Lands, Cambridge: Fenris-Wolf, 1975.
 Madagascar Divination, Cambridge : Fenris-Wolf, 1975.
 The Swastika, Bar Hill, England: Fenris-Wolf, 1975.
 Ancient Hill-Figures of England, The Institute of Geomantic Research, U.K.: Fenris-Wolf, 1976.
 Daddy Witch and Old Mother Redcap: Survivals of the Old Craft Under Victorian Christendom, Bar Hill, England: Fenris-Wolf, 1976.
 Leys & Zodiax, Cambridge : Fenris-Wolf, 1976.
 Terrestrial Zodiac in Britain, Bar Hill, Cambridge: The Institute of Geomantic Research, 1976 (with Robert Lord).
 Regent's Park: Town Planning-or Geomancy?, Cambridge: Fenris-Wolf, 1977 (with Rupert Pennick).
 The Geomancy of Cambridge, Bar Hill, Cambridge: The Institute of Geomantic Research, 1977.
 Ogham and Runic: Magical Writing of Old Britain and Northern Europe, Bar Hill, England: Fenris-Wolf, 1978.
 Ritual Magic in the Church of England, Cambridge: Institute of Geomantic Research, 1978.
 Sacred Geometry: An Introduction, Bar Hill: Fenris-Wolf, 1978.
 The Mysteries of King’s College Chapel, Cambridge, England: Cokaygne Press, 1978.
 The Ancient Science of Geomancy, London: Thames & Hudson, 1979.
 The Swastika, Bar Hill, England: Fenris-Wolf, 1979.
 Mother Shipton (Ursula Sontheil 1488-1561), Her Life and Prophecies, Bar Hill: Fenris-Wolf, 1980 (with Sheila Cann).
 Sacred Geometry: Symbolism and Purpose in Religious Structures, Wellingborough, England: Aquarian Press, 1980.
 The Grand Mystery: Being a Reprint of Two Tracts of the Eighteenth Century on the Secrets of Freemasonry, Bar Hill, England: Fenris-Wolf, 1980.
 The Indestructible Castle: An Essay on Paganism, Bar Hill, England: Fenris-Wolf, 1980.
 European Troytowns, The Institute of Geomantic Research, U.K.: Fenris-Wolf, February 1981.
 Hitler's Secret Sciences: His Quest for the Hidden Knowledge of the Ancients, Suffolk: Spearman, 1981.
 Tunnels Under London, Cambridge: Electric Traction, 1981.
 Wandlebury Mysteries, Bar Hill: Cambridgeshire Ancient Mysteries Group, 1981.
 (ed.) British Geomantic Pioneers, 1570-1932: Collected Works, Cambridgeshire, England: Institute of Geomantic Research, 1982.
 The 18th Rune, Bar Hill, England: Fenris-Wolf, 1982.
 Vintana: Geomancy and Astrology in Madagascar, Cambridge, England: The Institute of Geomantic Research, 1982.
 The Geomancy of Glastonbury Abbey, Bar Hill, England: Fenris-Wolf, 1983.
 Trams in Cambridge, Cambridge: Electric Traction, 1983.
 Labyrinths: Their Geomancy and Symbolism, Bar Hill, U.K.: Runestaff, 1984.
 Pagan Prophecy and Play in Northern Europe, Bar Hill, England: Runestaff, 1984
 Natural Measure, Bar Hill, U.K.: Runestaff, 1985.
 Runestaves and Ogham, Bar Hill, U.K.: Runestaff, 1985.
 Skulls, Cats and Witch Bottles, Bar Hill, U.K.: Runestaff, 1985.
 The Cosmic Axis, Bar Hill, U.K.: Runestaff, 1985.
 Traditional Board Games of Northern Europe, Bar Hill, U.K.: Runestaff, 1985.
 Earth Harmony: siting and protecting your home - a practical and spiritual guide, London: Century, 1987.
 Landscape Lines, Leys and Limits in Old England, Bar Hill, U.K.: Runestaff, 1987.
 Nineteen Centuries of Wrong, Bar Hill, U.K.: Runestaff, 1987.
 Bunkers Under London, Cambridge: Valknut Productions, 1988.
 Lines on the Landscape: Leys and Other Enigmas, London: Robert Hale, 1989 (with Paul Devereux).
 Practical Magic in the Northern Tradition, Wellingborough, U.K.: Thorsons, 1989.
 Games of the Gods, London: Rider, 1989.
 Practical Magic in the Northern Tradition, Wellingborough, England: Aquarian Press, 1989.
 Mazes and Labyrinths, London: Robert Hale, 1990.
 Runic Astrology: Starcraft and Timekeeping in the Northern Tradition, Wellingborough, U.K.: Thorsons, 1990.
 Celtic Art in the Northern Tradition, Bar Hill, England: Nideck, 1991.
 The Secret Lore of Runes and Other Ancient Alphabets, London: Rider, 1991.
 Rune Magic: The History and Practice of Ancient Runic Traditions, London: Aquarian/Thorsons, 1992.
 The Celtic Oracle: The Ancient Art of the Druids, London: Aquarian, 1992 (with Nigel Jackson).
 The Pagan Source Book: A Guide to the Festivals, Traditions and Symbols of the Year, London: Rider Books, 1992.
 Anima Loci, Bar Hill, England: The Way of The Eight Winds/Nideck, 1993.
 Wayland's House, Bar Hill, U.K.: Nideck/The Way of The Eight Winds, 1993.
 Secrets of East Anglian Magic, London: Robert Hale, 1995.
 The Inner Mysteries of the Goths: Rune-Lore and Secret Wisdom of the Northern Tradition, Chieveley, U.K.: Capall Bann, 1995.
 The Oracle of Geomancy: The Divinatory Arts of Raml, Geomantia, Sikidy and I Ching, Chieveley, U.K.: Capall Bann, 1995.
 Celtic Sacred Landscapes, London: Thames & Hudson, 1996.
 Secret Signs, Symbols, and Sigils, Chieveley, U.K.: Capall Bann, 1996.
 The Complete Illustrated Guide to Runes, London: Element, 1996.
 The Goddess Year, Chieveley, U.K.: Capall Bann, 1996 (with Helen Field).
 Dragons of the West, Chieveley, U.K.: Capall Bann, 1997.
 Leylines, London: Weidenfeld & Nicolson, 1997.
 Lost Lands and Sunken Cities, London: Capall Bann, 1997.
 The Celtic Cross: An Illustrated History and Celebration, London: Blandford, 1997.
 The Celtic Saints, London: Thorsons, 1997.
 Crossing the Borderlines: Guising, Masking, and Ritual Animal Disguises in the European Tradition, Chieveley, U.K.: Capall Bann, 1998.
 The God Year, Chieveley, U.K.: Capall Bann, 1998 (with Helen Field).
 The Haindl Rune Oracle: Divinations by Runes Using the Haindl Rune Oracle Cards", Stamford, CT: U.S. Games Systems, 1998.
 The Basic Runes, Cambridge : Library of the European Tradition, 1999.
 Beginnings. Geomancy, Builders' Rites, and Electional Astrology in the European Tradition, Chieveley, U.K.: Capall Bann, 1999.
 London's Early Tube Railways, Library of the European Tradition for Electric Traction Publications, 2000.
 Ogham and Coelbren: Keys to the Celtic Mysteries, Chieveley, U.K.: Capall Bann, 2000. 
 On Building in the European Tradition, Cambridge, England: The Library of European Tradition, 2000.
 Pargetting in Eastern England, Cambridge, England: The Library of European Tradition, 2000.
 Prophecy and Play, Cambridge, England: The Library of European Tradition, 2000.
 Waterloo and City Railway, Cambridge, England: The Library of European Tradition, 2000.
 On the Spiritual Arts and Crafts: Practising the Ancient Skills and Wisdom of Europe, Cambridge, England: The Library of European Tradition, 2001.
 The Pagan Book of Days: A Guide to the Festivals, Traditions, and Sacred Days of the Year, Rochester, Vt.: Destiny, 2001.
 The Three Fates, Bar Hill, Cambridge : Library of the European Tradition, 2001.
 Way of Natural Magic, London: Thorsons, 2001.
 Masterworks: The Arts and Crafts of Traditional Buildings in Northern Europe, Wymeswold, U.K.: Heart of Albion, 2002.
 The Derby Ram: An English Traditional Song and Mummers' Play, Cambridge: Old England House, 2002.
 The Power Within: The Way of the Warrior and the Martial Arts in the European Tradition, Chieveley, U.K.: Capall Bann, 2002.
 A Book of Beasts, Chieveley, U.K.: Capall Bann, 2003 (with Helen Field).
 Cambridge Public Transport Matters, Bar Hill : Electric Traction Publications, 2004.
 Cambridge: Spirit of Place, Bar Hill: Old England House, 2004.
 Makings, Cambridge : Old England House, 2004.
 Muses and Fates, Milverton, U.K.: Capall Bann, 2004.
 Threshold and Hearthstone Patterns, Bar Hill, England: Old England House, 2004
 Natural Magic, Earl Shilton, U.K.: Lear, 2005.
 New Troy Resurgent: Continuity and Renewal Through the Eternal Tradition, Cambridge: Spiritual Land, 2005.
 The Bloomsbury Wonder: Sacred Geometry and the Eternal Tradition, Cambridge: Spiritual Land, 2005.
 The Mysteries of St Martin's: Sacred Geometry and the Symmetry of Order, Cambridge: Spiritual Land, 2005.
 The Sacred Art of Geometry: Temples of the Phoenix, Cambridge: Spiritual Land, 2005.
 The Temple of Concord: Legendary History and the London Legendarium, Cambridge: Spiritual Land, 2005.
 Folk-lore of East Anglia and Adjoining Counties, Cambridge: Spiritual Arts & Crafts, 2006.
 The Eldritch World, Earl Shilton, U.K.: Lear, 2006.
 Wyrdstaves of the North, Earl Shilton, U.K.: Lear, 2010.
 In Field and Fen, Earl Shilton, U.K.: Lear, 2011.
 The Toadman, Hinkley, U.K.: Society of Esoteric Endeavour, 2011.
 Operative Witchcraft: The Nature of Historic Witchcraft in Great Britain, Leicester: Lear Books, 2012.
 Magic in the Landscape,  Leicestershire: Lear Books, 2013.
 The Secret Lore of London: The City's Forgotten Stories and Mythology, Coronet, U.K., 2016.

 
Scientific Research Papers

 Paraphysomonas Butcheri sp. nov. a marine, colourless, scale-bearing member of the Chrysophyceae, British Phycological Journal (1972) 7(1) pp. 45-48.
 Flagellar scales in Oxyrrhis marina Dujardin, British Phycological Journal (1972) 7(3) pp. 357-360.
 Paraphysomonas corbidifera sp. nov., a marine, colourless, scale-bearing member of the Chrysophyceae, British Phycological Journal (1973) 8(2) pp. 147-151.
 On the identity of Asteromonas propulsum Butcher, British Phycological Journal (1974) 9(1) pp. 101-106.
 Some observations on the cell surface structures of species of Mayorella and Paramoeba, Archiv für Protistenkunde (1975) 118 pp. 221–226.
 Syncrypta glomerifera sp. nov., a marine member of the Chrysophyceae bearing a new form of scale, British Phycological Journal (1975) 10(4) pp. 363-370.
 Studies of the External Morphology of Pyramimonas: 2 pyramimonas obovata, Archiv fuer Protistenkunde (1976) 118(3) pp. 221-226.
 Studies of the External Morphology of Pyramimonas: 3 pyramimonas grossii, Archiv fuer Protistenkunde (1976) 118(4) pp. 285-290.
 The occurrence of body scales in oxyrrhis marina dujardin, British Phycological Journal (1976) 11(4) pp. 345-348.
 Studies of the External Morphology of Pyramimonas: 4 pyramimonas virginica new species, Archiv fuer Protistenkunde (1977) 119(3) pp. 239-246
 The occurrence of scales in the peridinian dinoflagellate heterocapsa triquetra (Ehrenb.) stein, British Phycological Journal (1977) 12(1) pp. 63-66.
 Studies of the External Morphology of Pyramimonas 5. P. amylifera Conrad, Archiv für Protistenkunde (1978) 120(1-2) pp. 142-147.
 Studies of the External Morphology of Pyramimonas l. P. orientalis and its allies in culture, Archiv für Protistenkunde (1978) 120(3) pp. 304-311.
 Flagellar scales in Hemiselmis brunnescensButcher and H. virescensDroop (Cryptophyceae), Archiv für Protistenkunde, Volume 124, Issue 3, 1981, Pages pp. 267-270.
 Ochromonas villosa sp. nov., a member of the Chrysophyceae with a fibrous body coating, Archiv für Protistenkunde (1981) 124(4) pp. 430-436.
 Studies of the External Morphology of Pyramimonas: 7. Pyramimonas occidentalis sp. nov., Archiv für Protistenkunde (1982) 125(1-4) pp. 223-232.
 Studies of the External Morphology of Pyramimonas: 8. Pyramimonas gorlestonae sp. nov., Archiv für Protistenkunde (1982) 125(1-4) pp. 233-240.
 Observations on the Fine Structure of Hemiselmis brunnescens BUTCHER, Archiv für Protistenkunde (1982) 126(2) pp. 241-245.
 Studies of the External Morphology of Pyramimonas 6. Pyramimonas cirolanae sp. nov., Archiv für Protistenkunde (1982) 125(1-4) pp. 87-94.
 Studies of the External Morphology of Pyramimonas: 7. Pyramimonas occidentalis sp. nov., Archiv für Protistenkunde (1982) 125(1-4) pp. 223-232.
 Studies of the External Morphology of Pyramimonas: 8. Pyramimonas gorlestonae sp. nov., Archiv für Protistenkunde (1982) 125(1-4) pp. 233-240.
 The Fine Structrue of Chlamydomonas bullosaButcher, Archiv für Protistenkunde (1982) 125(1-4) pp. 241-248.
 Trypanosoma (Schizotrypanum) species from insectivorous bats (Microchiroptera): characterization by polypeptide profiles, Systematic Parasitology (1982) 4(2) pp. 155-168.
 Studies of the External Morphology of Pyramimonas: 9. Pyramimonas spinifera sp. nov., Archiv für Protistenkunde, Volume 127, Issue 1, 1983, Pages 1-7.
 Comparative ultrastructure and occurrence of scales in Pyramimonas (chlorophyta, prasinophyceae), Archiv für Protistenkunde (1984) 128(1-2) pp. 3-11.
 Observations on Petalomonas cantuscygni, n. sp., a new Halo-tolerant Strain, Archiv für Protistenkunde (1986) 132(1-2) pp. 63-71.

See also
Stephen Flowers
Runes
Guido von List
Occult
Mumming
Mountain Dulcimer

References

"Biography - Pennick, Nigel Campbell (1946-)": An article from: Contemporary Authors'' by Gale Reference Team 

1946 births
Living people
British modern pagans
English people of Cornish descent
English occult writers
Modern pagan writers
People from Guildford
Sacred geometry